The Combating Antibiotic Resistant Bacteria Biopharmaceutical Accelerator (CARB-X) is a global nonprofit partnership focused on supporting antibacterial research. Its mission is to strengthen the pipeline of therapeutics, diagnostics and preventatives to diagnose and treat life-threatening bacterial infections. CARB-X was launched in summer of 2016 at the Boston University School of Law, where CARB-X Executive Director Professor Kevin Outterson teaches health law, corporate law, and co-directs the Health Law Program.

In its first five years, from 2016 to 2021, CARB-X awarded $361 million to 92 projects. In 2022, BARDA and Wellcome renewed committed renewed funding up to an additional $370 million to CARB-X. In addition to awarding non-dilutive funding, CARB-X partners with a Global Accelerator Network (GAN) of experts who offer product developers advice on a range of issues, including drug development, business strategy, policy and regulatory affairs.

Antimicrobial resistance background 
Bacteria are constantly evolving to evade death. Even the most powerful "last resort" drugs are becoming less effective due to resistance. Without an arsenal of effective antibiotics to treat infections, modern medical procedures – such as chemotherapy and surgeries – are more risky and put patients' lives at risk. According to the World Health Organization, antimicrobial resistance is a top global health threat, killing 700,000 people annually throughout the world. CARB-X supports projects that are focused on the most dangerous bacteria identified by the World Health Organization (WHO) and Centers for Disease Control and Prevention (CDC) priority lists.

On average, it costs more than $1 billion and takes 1–15 years to develop a new antibiotic for use in patients.  A strong economic model to incentivize a steady supply of new antibiotics does not exist. Without enough revenue to recover research and development expenses, small antibiotic companies have been filing for bankruptcy, and large pharmaceutical companies are shuttering their antibiotics divisions. New economic models, support from organizations like CARB-X, and increased investment are needed to drive innovation.

Funding 
CARB-X is led by Boston University, and in its first five years, from 2016-2021, it has been funded by three governments and two nonprofit organizations. These include the US Department of Health and Human Services Biomedical Advanced Research and Development Authority (BARDA), part of the Office of the Assistant Secretary for Preparedness and Response (ASPR); the Wellcome Trust; Germany's Federal Ministry of Education and Research (BMBF); the UK Government's Global Antimicrobial Resistance Innovation Fund (UK GAMRIF); and the Bill & Melinda Gates Foundation. CARB-X also receives in-kind support from the National Institute of Allergy and Infectious Diseases (NIAID), part of the US National Institutes of Health (NIH).

References

External links 

 

Non-profit corporations
Partnerships
Boston University School of Law
Antimicrobial resistance organizations
Funding bodies